Crepidium elegans is a species of epidendroid orchids in the tribe Malaxideae.

See also 
 List of Crepidium species

References

External links 
 Crepidium elegans at the International Plant Name Index (IPNI)

elegans
Plants described in 2011